In traditional Chinese medicine the Small Intestine is a fu organ in the Zang-fu concept.

The small intestine governs the separation of the clear from the turbid. The small intestine further digests food decomposed initially by the stomach. The clear, referring to the essence of water and grain and to the large amount of fluid, is absorbed by the spleen and distributed to the whole body. The turbid is sent downwards to the large intestine, while the useless water is infused to the bladder. The disorders of the small intestine are attributable to failure to separate the clear from the turbid dirt in the digesting process, manifesting stool and urinary disturbance, such as abdominal pain, diarrhea, scanty urine, etc.

The Small intestine and its paired organ, the Heart, are associated with the element of fire and the emotions of joy or agitation.

Transporting point of SI: Urinary Bladder 27.  Conception vessel – anterior midline from perineum to lower lip.  This is also the Alarm point for the SI which is called "Gateway to the Source" (guan yuan).  Governing vessel is from perineum, to spine to crown of head down to upper lip.

SI Meridian Points (S1-S10):
 SI-1 (Shao Ze/Lesser Marsh): Resuscitates, promotes lactation, opens orifices, clears Heat.
 SI-2 (Qian Gu/Front Valley): Clears Heat, activates the meridian.
 SI-3 (Hou Xi/Back Stream): Benefits the neck and back, treats malaria activates the meridian.
 SI-4 (Wan Gu/Wrist Bone): Activates and clears the meridian, resolves Damp-Heat.
 SI-5 (Yang Gu/Yang Valley): Clears Heat, clears the meridian, reduces swelling.
 SI-6 (Yang Lao/Nourishing the Aged): Activates the meridian, benefits the eyes, benefits the shoulder and arm, alleviates pain.
 SI-7 (Zhi Zheng/Branch of the Upright): Activates the meridian, frees obstructions, calms the Shen, clears Heat, alleviates pain.
 SI-8 (Xiao Hai/Small Sea): Activates the meridian, alleviates pain, clears Heat and Damp-Heat.
 SI-9 (Jian Zhen/True Shoulder): Activates the meridian, alleviates pain, benefits the shoulder.
 SI-10 (Nao Shu/Upper Arm Shu): Activates the meridian, alleviates pain, benefits the shoulder.

See also
 Four stages
 Six levels
 Three jiaos

References

 https://theory.yinyanghouse.com/acupuncturepoints/smallintestine_meridian_graphic
 http://www.sacredlotus.com/go/acupuncture/channel/small_intestine_channel_of_hand_tai_yang
 http://www.acatcm.com/small-intestine-meridian-hand-tai-yin-points

Traditional Chinese medicine